This is a list of incumbent heads of state and government in any country who ran for another term in office but were not reelected.

List

References

Lists of national presidents
Presidents